Renzo Testolin (born 28 March 1968) is an Italian politician and accountant from the Valdostan Union party, current President of Aosta Valley.

Testolin served as acting President of Aosta Valley following the resignation of Antonio Fosson. He also served as Vice President of Aosta Valley from December 2018 to December 2019 and has served as a member of the Regional Council of Aosta Valley since July 2013. He was elected President of Aosta Valley on 2 March 2023.

Career 
Testolin was elected to the Aymavilles town council in 1995, and from 2005 to 2010 served as deputy mayor of Aymavilles. Testolin was elected to the Regional Council of Aosta Valley in the 2013 Valdostan regional election and was reelected in 2018 and 2020. He has served in various cabinet roles, including Regional Councilor for agriculture and natural resources and Councilor for Budget, Finance, Assets and Investments. On December 10, 2018, he was appointed vice president by Antonio Fosson and held that position until 2019, when Fosson resigned after an investigation into 'Ndrangheta interference in the 2018 elections and Testolin was appointed acting president. He served as acting president until October 21, 2020, when Erik Lavévaz was appointed president.

References 

Living people
1968 births
Valdostan Union politicians
Presidents of Aosta Valley
People from Aosta